Luis César "Lucho" Avilés (30 April 1938 — 8 June 2019) was a Uruguayan-born  Argentine journalist and television presenter.

Early life 
He was born in Montevideo, Uruguay in 1938. In 1965 he moved to Argentina and became an Argentine citizen. Despite rumours that he had died in November 2010, he was still alive. He died on 8 June 2019 at the age of 81.

His first work in Argentina was for the Crónica newspaper.

References

External links

1938 births
Argentine journalists
Male journalists
People from Montevideo
2019 deaths
Uruguayan expatriates in Argentina
Naturalized citizens of Argentina